Love's Crushing Diamond is the debut studio album by American band Mutual Benefit. It was originally released as a limited edition 250 LP run by Soft Eyes on October 7, 2013. Other Music Recording Company re-released the album on a larger scale on December 3, 2013. The album was recorded on the road and at Ohm Recording Studio in Austin, TX, Temporary Autonomous Zone in St Louis, MO, and Thee Hallowed Sound Dungeon in Boston, MA.

Critical reception

Love's Crushing Diamond received widespread acclaim from contemporary music critics. At Metacritic, which assigns a normalized rating out of 100 to reviews from mainstream critics, the album received an average score of 84, based on 18 reviews, which indicates "universal acclaim".

Ian Cohen of Pitchfork Media praised the album, stating, "Love’s Crushing Diamond is not folk in the escapist sense either, though it was recorded during a “year of notable absences” in San Diego, Austin and Boston. Many of these songs take place in mundane, unglamorous locales—city trains, mining towns, cornfields, motel rooms. And in Lee's point of view, you need to discover a little space within those places that you can call your own and then invite some people to share it with. Yeah, it does skew kinda hippie, as Lee’s lyrics detail picking roses by the lake and how a river can’t help but keep on keepin’ on. That’s perfectly fine within the scheme of Love’s Crushing Diamond, which always sounds populated in a way that stresses its central themes of getting your own shit together so you’re better prepared to care for someone else."

Track listing

Personnel
Main personnel
 Jordan Lee – sounds
 Jake Falby – violin
 George Folickman – bass
 Marc Merza – electric guitar
 Cameron Potter – drums
 Dillon Zahner – hand drums, percussion
 Virginia de la Pozas – vocals
 Cory Siegler  – artwork, design, vocals
 Julie Byrne – vocals

Additional personnel
 Jake Yuhas – mastering
 Ali Carter – sound hunting
 Chico Jones – cacophony
 Austin Kalman – cacophony
 Stefan Grabowski – inspirational electronics

References

2013 debut albums
Mutual Benefit (band) albums